These are the films shown at the 7th New York Underground Film Festival, held from March 8–14, 2000.

See also
 New York Underground Film Festival site
 2000 Festival Archive

New York Underground Film Festival
Underground Film Festival
2000 film festivals
New York Underground Film
2000 in American cinema